Ascendancy is a 1983 British drama film directed by Edward Bennett and starring Julie Covington and Ian Charleson. It tells the story of a woman who is a member of the British landowning 'Ascendancy' in Ireland during World War I. Gradually, she learns about the Irish independence movement, and becomes involved with it.

Cast
Julie Covington as Connie Wintour
Ian Charleson as Lt. Ryder
John Phillips as Wintour
Susan Engel as Nurse
Philip Locke as Dr Strickland
Kieran Montague as Dr Kelson
Rynagh O'Grady as Rose
Philomena McDonagh as Mary
Michael McKnight as Vesey
Jeremy Sinden as Darcy
 Shay Gorman as Keir

Awards
The film was entered into the 33rd Berlin International Film Festival where it won the Golden Bear.

References

External links
 

1983 films
British drama films
1980s English-language films
1983 drama films
Golden Bear winners
Films directed by Edward Bennett
1980s British films